Michal Matějovský (born 20 October 1985 in Hradec Králové) is a Czech auto racing driver.

Career
Early racing included the Czech Škoda Matador Pick-up Championship, the Czech Škoda Octavia Cup, and the Czech BMW 1 Challenge. In 2008 he competed in the SEAT León Eurocup, finishing the season sixteenth on points. As a reward for his performance in the Eurocup, he entered one round of the FIA World Touring Car Championship at Brno in 2008. He drove a SEAT León for the SUNRED Racing Development Team, with a best placed finish of twenty-second in race one. He went on to compete in the European Touring Car Cup for O2 Motorsport CSMS in an Alfa Romeo 156.

Racing record

Complete World Touring Car Championship results
(key) (Races in bold indicate pole position) (Races in italics indicate fastest lap)

References

1985 births
Living people
Sportspeople from Hradec Králové
Czech racing drivers
World Touring Car Championship drivers
SEAT León Eurocup drivers
European Touring Car Cup drivers